Guam History and Chamorro Heritage Day is a public holiday in Guam, celebrating the discovery of the island. It has been held on the first Monday of March each year since 1970 in commemoration of the anniversary of the discovery of Guam in 1521. On March 6, 2001, Guam celebrated the 480th anniversary of the discovery of Guam.

References

History of Guam
Guam
1970 establishments in Guam
1970s in Guam
Recurring events established in 1970
Holidays and observances by scheduling (nth weekday of the month)
March observances
1970 in Guam